John Ready ( – 10 July 1845) was a British Army officer, who served as Lieutenant Governor of Prince Edward Island from 1824 to 1831 and also as Lieutenant Governor of the Isle of Man from 1832 to 1845.

Career
Ready joined the British Army as an ensign in 1796. He was appointed Secretary to the Lord Lieutenant of Ireland in 1815 and military secretary and then civil secretary to the Governor General of British North America in 1818. In 1824 he was appointed lieutenant governor of Prince Edward Island: there he imported livestock at his own expense, promoted the building of roads and ensured there was a school in every town. He became Lieutenant Governor of the Isle of Man in 1832 but died in office at Castletown on the Isle of Man in 1845 and was buried on the island with full military honours.

Family
In 1804 he married Susanna Bromley; they had two sons and two daughters; following the death of his first wife he married Sarah Tobin in 1836. His son John Tobin Ready joined the 66th Foot as an officer in 1854.  As a veteran of the 2nd Afghan War (Maiwand/Kandahar) Colonel John T. Ready retired in 1887. One of his daughters married Dr. Charles Milner.

References

Brief biography from the government of Prince Edward Island

1777 births
1845 deaths
British Army generals
Lieutenant Governors of the Colony of Prince Edward Island
West Yorkshire Regiment officers
69th Regiment of Foot officers
Lieutenant Governors of the Isle of Man